.ms is the Internet country code top-level domain (ccTLD) for Montserrat, a British Overseas Territory.

Usage 
 Microsoft uses this as an abbreviation for projects such as ch9.ms or 1drv.ms for its OneDrive. In particular, aka.ms is used extensively as a URL shortener for Microsoft's web sites, such as http://aka.ms/MFAsetup.
 Websites based in, or having to do with, the U.S. state of Mississippi also use the .ms domain as MS is the official United States Postal Service abbreviation for the state. 
 Some companies based in the Brazilian state of Mato Grosso do Sul (officially abbreviated as MS) use the .ms TLD
 Some companies and organisations in the German town Münster in Westphalia use the TLD as well since MS is the official vehicle license plate code for the city.
 The New York Times uses .ms as a top level domain name for permalinks referring to New York Times addresses.  For example, http://nyti.ms/ reaches The New York Times homepage.
 The Hillary Clinton 2016 presidential campaign used the domain name "HRC.ms" as a URL shortener.
 The family of F1 driver Michael Schumacher used the domain name keepfighting.ms for his foundation, established after his skiing accident in Méribel on December 29, 2013
 A Dutch foundation for the cure of multiple sclerosis (MS) uses arenamoves.ms.

Second-level domain names
 com.ms
 edu.ms
 gov.ms
 net.ms
 org.ms

References

External links
 IANA .ms whois information
 .ms Registry operated by MNI Networks Limited
 Domain Registration Services

Country code top-level domains
Communications in Montserrat
Computer-related introductions in 1997

sv:Toppdomän#M